United Nations Security Council resolution 756, adopted unanimously on 29 May 1992, after considering a report by the Secretary-General regarding the United Nations Disengagement Observer Force (UNDOF), the Council noted its efforts to establish a durable and just peace in the Middle East.

The resolution decided to call upon the parties concerned to immediately implement Resolution 338 (1973), it renewed the mandate of the Observer Force for another six months until 30 November 1992 and requested that the Secretary-General submit a report on the situation at the end of that period.

See also
 Arab–Israeli conflict
 Golan Heights
 Israel–Syria relations
 List of United Nations Security Council Resolutions 701 to 800 (1991–1993)

References

External links
 
Text of the Resolution at undocs.org

 0756
 0756
 0756
Arab–Israeli peace process
Israel–Syria relations
May 1992 events
1992 in Israel
1992 in Syria